Guimoon: The Lightless Door is a 2021 South Korean horror film, directed by Sim Deok-Geun and starring Kim Kang-woo, Kim So-hye and Lee Jung-hyung. The film is simultaneously produced in 2D, ScreenX and 4DX versions. This is a first time in any Korean film that audience can feel the horror of the characters with screens extended to both walls, and 4DX equipped with motion chairs and special environmental equipment. The film depicts the story of the director of a psychic research institute and college students. It was released in theatres in 2D, ScreenX, and 4DX on August 25, 2021.

Synopsis
The film depicts a bizarre horror situation in an abondened training center in Guisari. A building manager in 1990 murdered some guests then committed suicide. It became an annual happening, then the training center was closed. It became a ghost house as rumours begin to circulate.

Do-jin (Kim Kang-woo), the director of the Psychic Research Institute, in an attempt to unveil the secrets of his mother's death enter the training centre. Three college students Hye-young (Kim So-hye), Tae-hoon, and Won-jae also enter the training center to shoot a video for competition. And they meet a chilling horror situation as they open the lightless door.

Cast
 Kim Kang-woo as Do-jin, director of the Psychic Research Institute  
 Kim So-hye as Hye-young, leader of college students
 Lee Jung-hyung as Tae-hoon, a college student who became a reporter for a horror video contest
 Hong Jin-ki as Won-jae
 Jang Jae-ho as Kim Seok-ho

Production
The film was shot in an abandoned building in Pocheon to bring out horror in the film.

Release
The film was released on August 25, 2021 on 692 screens in usual 2D version as well as 4DX format (it moves the actual seats according to the movie scene and creates various environmental effects such as wind, light, and fragrance), and Screen X (it uses three sides as screens, not only the front, but also the left and right walls).

Reception
As per the Korean Film Promotion Council (Kofic), the film ranks 4th on the Korean box office on the first day of its release.

, it grossed US$676,659 from 93,657 admissions.

References

External links
 
 
 
 

CJ Entertainment films
2020s Korean-language films
2021 films
South Korean horror films
4DX films
2021 horror films
ScreenX films